Snåsa may refer to:

Places
Snåsa, a municipality in Trøndelag county, Norway
Snåsa (village), a village in the municipality of Snåsa in Trøndelag county, Norway
Snåsa Church, a church built in 1200 in the municipality of Snåsa in Trøndelag county, Norway
Snåsa Station, a railway station in the municipality of Snåsa in Trøndelag county, Norway
Lake Snåsa, a lake in the municipalities of Snåsa and Steinkjer in Trøndelag county, Norway